Kira Roessler (born June 12, 1961) is an American musician and two-time Emmy Award-winning dialogue editor. She is best known as the bassist for the influential hardcore punk band Black Flag from 1983 to 1985. Since the mid-1980s, she has been a member of the rock duo Dos with her ex-husband Mike Watt.

Early life 
Born in New Haven, Connecticut, Roessler lived there until age eight when her family moved to the Caribbean until she was eleven and thereafter in California, mostly in Los Angeles. Her brother is Paul Roessler, a keyboardist known for involvement in several Los Angeles area bands including The Screamers.

Career

Music
Roessler began studying piano when she was six but quit at age eleven. At fourteen she picked up the bass guitar and committed to learning the instrument. Her first band was called Waxx and she played her first gig at age sixteen at Whisky a Go Go. Other early bands were Sexsick, The Visitors, and The Monsters. She then joined with a post-Germs Pat Smear to form Twisted Roots.

Members of Black Flag heard her playing while she was sitting in with L.A. punk group DC3. This led to her being asked to join Black Flag in 1983 to replace founding member Chuck Dukowski. Vocalist Henry Rollins later reported that Greg Ginn, Black Flag's leader, guitarist and primary songwriter, had grown frustrated with Dukowski's failure to progress as a musician beyond the band's hardcore punk roots and was drawn to Roessler's more nimble and sophisticated playing. Roessler was majoring in applied engineering at UCLA, and Black Flag's subsequent tours were worked around her school schedule, which was a condition for her to join the band. Her bass playing was featured on five of Black Flag's studio albums and two officially released live albums. During her early live performances with the band she was sometimes mistaken as male due to her androgynous appearance, and she subsequently dressed in more glamorously traditional female garb for the band's tours. She remained in the band until completing touring behind their album In My Head in the autumn of 1985, then graduated from UCLA in 1986.

After Black Flag, she formed the two-bass duo Dos with Mike Watt (to whom she was married between 1987 and 1994). Dos' most recent album was released in 2011. She wrote or co-wrote songs for what would be the Minutemen's final album, 3-Way Tie, and contributed lyrics to Watt's post-Minutemen band Firehose. She later contributed artwork to Watt's first solo album, Ball-Hog or Tugboat?.

She appeared as a backing vocalist on the Rise Above: 24 Black Flag Songs to Benefit the West Memphis Three tribute album in 2003 along with other musical artists, including other Black Flag veterans.

In December 2018, Roessler joined with Devin Hoff to form the two-bass band AwkWard and released their first album In Progress.

On August 13, 2021, on the Protonic Reversal podcast, Kira revealed that an album of solo material would be released on October 19 on Kitten Robot records.

Film work
Roessler now works as a dialogue editor on theatrical films in Los Angeles, sometimes credited under her full name, sometimes simply as kira. She has worked on productions including Confessions of a Dangerous Mind (2002), Under the Tuscan Sun (2003), and The Twilight Saga: New Moon (2009), and has also appeared onscreen in the documentaries We Jam Econo: The Story of the Minutemen, American Hardcore and What Drives Us . She has won Emmy Awards for her work on the John Adams episode "Don't Tread on Me" as well as her work on Game of Thrones.

Most recently, Roessler was involved in the sound editing team that won a 2016 Oscar for Mad Max: Fury Road.

Discography
Twisted Roots
Pretentiawhat (1981)

Black Flag
Family Man (1984)
Slip It In (1984)
Live '84 [Live] (1984)
Loose Nut (1985)
The Process of Weeding Out [EP] (1985)
In My Head (1985)
Who's Got the 10½? [Live] (1986)

dos
dos (1986)
numero dos [EP] (1989)
uno con dos (1989)
 CD compiling the first two Dos releases
justamente tres (1996)
dos y dos (2011)

AwkWard (with Devin Hoff)
In Progress (2018)

Other
Minuteflag (1985)
Rise Above: 24 Black Flag Songs to Benefit the West Memphis Three (2002)
Gimmie Gimmie Gimmie: Reinterpreting Black Flag (2010)

References

External links

Kira Roessler interview by Alice Bag

1962 births
Living people
Musicians from New Haven, Connecticut
American punk rock bass guitarists
Hardcore punk musicians
Black Flag (band) members
Dos (band) members
University of California, Los Angeles alumni
SST Records artists
New Alliance Records artists
Kill Rock Stars artists
Emmy Award winners
Women bass guitarists
Alternative rock bass guitarists
Guitarists from Connecticut
20th-century American guitarists
20th-century women musicians
American women in film
American sound editors
Women sound editors
20th-century American women guitarists